Albert Victor McKinnon (19 January 1926 – 4 June 2001) was an Australian rules footballer who played with Hawthorn in the Victorian Football League (VFL).

Family
The son of John McKinnon (1886–1973) and Lynda McKinnon (1899–1988), née Hyde, Albert Victor McKinnon was born at Williamstown on 19 January 1926.

War Service
McKinnon enlisted to serve in the Royal Australian Air Force in February 1944, shortly after turning 18. He served in Melbourne and was a Leading Aircraftman at the time of his discharge in July 1945.

Football
McKinnon first trained with Hawthorn in 1946, being noted as a centre half-forward from Surrey Hills. He played briefly in the reserves but returned to Surrey Hills for three years before returning to Hawthorn in 1949 where he played the majority of games over the next four seasons. He later played with Trafalgar in the Gippsland Football League.

Notes

External links 

1926 births
2001 deaths
Australian rules footballers from Melbourne
Hawthorn Football Club players
Royal Australian Air Force personnel of World War II
Military personnel from Melbourne
People from Williamstown, Victoria